Vytfutia is a genus of Indonesian araneomorph spiders in the family Phyxelididae, and was first described by Christa Laetitia Deeleman-Reinhold in 1986.  it contains only two species, found only on Borneo and Sumatra: V. bedel and V. pallens.

See also
 List of Phyxelididae species

References

Araneomorphae genera
Phyxelididae
Spiders of Asia